A shooting stick is a combined walking stick and folding chair. It is generally used as a short-term seat at outdoor events.

A traditional British shooting stick is a wooden or metal shaft terminating at the base in a plate foot, with a bifurcated handle at top that folds out to form a simple seat.  The seat may be a narrow saddle of leather or webbing.  The plate foot typically extends into a metal point intended to dig into the ground for support, although a rubber ferrule may be offered for use on hard surfaces.

References

Seats
Walking